Jukumarini (Aymara jukumari bear, -ni a suffix to indicate ownership, "the one with a bear") is a mountain in the Tunari mountain range of the Bolivian Andes. It is situated in the Cochabamba Department, Quillacollo Province, Vinto Municipality, south of the mountain Tunari.

See also 
 Jatun Q'asa
 Puma Apachita
 Wayna Tunari

References 

Mountains of Cochabamba Department